Cord Asendorf Sr. (27 January 1858 – 6 January 1944) was a German–American businessman based in Savannah, Georgia. A prominent merchant, he is also noted for designing Savannah's "Gingerbread House", at today's 1921 Bull Street, in 1899.

Life and career 

Asendorf was born in Osterholz, Germany, on 27 January 1858. He worked with his father, building cigar boxes, before emigrating to the United States in September 1872, aged 14, and settling in Savannah, Georgia. He became a U.S. citizen in April 1879, shortly after which he worked for his uncle, John M. Asendorf, in his grocery store, located at the northwestern corner of Jones Lane and Habersham Street. He was living at 49 Jones Street.

Cord opened his own store, on Tattnall Street at its intersection with Gordon Lane, in 1881. He sold the business to his brother, Fred, and opened at least two more locations. He owned a grocery store and saloon at today's 556 East Liberty Street (251 East Broad Street). The property was built in 1883. One of his relatives, Peter August Asendorf (1855–1930) owned a store at the corner of East Broad and Charlton streets around the same time.

With the success of the businesses, Asendorf purchased the 1888-built property at 317–319 Huntingdon Street.

In 1890, he married fellow German immigrant Bernhardine Hagen, of Lehe, who arrived in Savannah six years earlier. (Her brother, an engineer, was killed in an accident on the voyage from Europe.) They married, in an evening service at the Lutheran Church of the Ascension, on Bernhardine's 21st birthday, 19 February. En route to the reception, at Turner Hall, the horses pulling their carriage became startled by the music playing upon their arrival at the venue. They bolted without the driver, James Hines, who had alighted to open the door for the newlyweds, and the carriage struck a telegraph pole at the corner of Broughton Street and Jefferson Street. The collision did not stop the horses, however; instead, they continued running, despite the best efforts of the driver, who was dragged under the wheels. In front of a Singer sewing-machine agency, the carriage hit a signpost, knocking it over and almost overturning the carriage. The horses were stopped and the occupants of the carriage were helped out by Asendorf's brother and groomsman.

The Asendorfs lived above the East Liberty Street businesses. They had eight known children: Cord Jr. (born 1892), Anna Marie (1894), Christian (1896), Wilma (1899), Anna (1901), Adolph (1903), Sophie (1905) and Meta Johanna (1907). Their first child, a daughter, died shortly after birth. Meta died in 2004, aged 96.

Between the births of their second and third children, the Asendorfs took their only trip back to Germany.

In 1899, the "Gingerbread House" at 1921 Bull Street in Savannah was completed, the work of Hawley Construction Company. Also known as the Asendorf House, Asendorf had designed it in the Carpenter Gothic style, and he retired shortly after his family moved in. They had lost another child in infancy in 1898, an event which almost led to Asendorf permanently halting construction on their home. As it transpired, five more children were born at their new home. His family lived there until the 1970s. In 1933, president Theodore Roosevelt stopped his motorcade so that his mother could look at the house. It has also been featured in several films.

In his business and social circles he became a close acquaintance of compatriot and prominent Savannah baker Captain John Derst (1838–1928). They were both members of the German Volunteers, with Asendorf being a corporal and Derst captain. The Volunteers were established 1846.

Asendorf owned one of the first cars in Savannah, a Cole 30–40.

Bernhardine Asendorf died on 26 December 1930, aged 61. She was buried in Savannah's Bonaventure Cemetery.

Death 
Asendorf died on 6 January 1944, aged 85. He was interred beside his wife at Bonaventure.

References 

1858 births
1944 deaths
19th-century German businesspeople
20th-century German businesspeople
19th-century American businesspeople
20th-century American businesspeople
People from Savannah, Georgia
German emigrants to the United States
People from Osterholz